Czyżowice may refer to:

Czyżowice, Opole Voivodeship (south-west Poland)
Czyżowice, Silesian Voivodeship (south Poland)
Czyżowice, Świętokrzyskie Voivodeship (south-central Poland)